Carex brysonii is a tussock-forming species of perennial sedge in the family Cyperaceae. It is native to parts of Alabama.

See also
List of Carex species

References

brysonii
Plants described in 1993
Flora of Alabama